The Thomson TO9 is a home computer introduced by French company Thomson SA in 1985.

It's based on the Thomson TO7/70 with new features. It included a built-in 320 Kb 3.5" floppy drive unit, and inputs for light pen, joystick, and mouse. The ROM included some utilities like: two BASIC versions, a word processor (Paragraphe) and a database program (Fiche & Dossiers). The machine was compatible with the previous TO7 and TO7/70 models. Ten games were released for the TO9.

Introduced in October 1985, the Thomson TO9 was quickly replaced with the Thomson TO9+ that came out in 1986.

References

6809-based home computers
Thomson computers